T. V. Radhakrishnan, better known as Kaka Radhakrishnan ( – 14 June 2012) was an Indian actor who acted in Tamil language films from the year 1940. He is also notable for having introduced his childhood friend, Sivaji Ganesan, into films.

Career
T. V. Radhakrishnan as a child made his debut with Uthama Puthiran (1940) as son of NS Krishnan. He had the prefix "kaka" (crow) attached to his name after a role he played as a young boy,in the film Mangayarkarasi (1949). In the film, he literally climbed a tree to catch a crow and since has been associated with the crow, earning him the nickname.

He acted in 1947 movie "Paithiyakaran" a NSK movie where MGR acted as a supporting character. Radhakrishnan acted in over 400 films which includes Tamil, Telugu and Malayalam films. After performing a variety of roles with several actors of yesteryear Tamil cinema, he experienced renewed interest thanks to actor Kamal Haasan who believed newer audiences should not miss watching such talent.

Family and death
Radhakrishnan died on 14 June 2012 following a brief illness.

Notable filmography

References

External links

1920s births
Indian male film actors
Tamil comedians
2012 deaths
Male actors from Tiruchirappalli
Male actors in Tamil cinema
Indian male comedians
21st-century Indian male actors